Jim Kerwin (March 23, 1941 - August 13, 2021) was an American retired basketball player and college coach.

Kerwin, a 6'3" shooting guard from Long Branch, New Jersey who attended Croydon Hall High School in Middletown, New Jersey, came to Tulane and was a three-year starter for the Green Wave and one of the Southeastern Conference's top scorers. Kerwin left Tulane as the school's all-time leading scorer (since eclipsed) with 1,462 points. After the season, he was drafted by the New York Knicks in the 1963 NBA draft (sixth round, 45th pick), but never played in the National Basketball Association (NBA).

Following an Amateur Athletic Union (AAU) career with the Phillips 66ers, Kerwin moved to coaching at the junior college level, coaching Northern Oklahoma College and Seminole State College, where he coached future NBA player Anthony Bowie. Kerwin then moved to Oklahoma as an assistant to Billy Tubbs for six seasons, coaching Sooner players such as Mookie Blaylock, Stacey King, Harvey Grant, Brent Price, and Ricky Grace, then moved to Dana Altman's staff at Kansas State for two seasons. He was then named head coach for the Western Illinois University, where he coached for eleven seasons, compiling a record of 135–174. He resigned in 2003, citing health concerns.

Kerwin's brother Tom played basketball at Centenary College of Louisiana and for the Pittsburgh Pipers of the American Basketball Association (ABA).

Kerwin died in Springdale, Arkansas at the age of 81.

References

1941 births
Living people
American men's basketball players
Basketball coaches from New Jersey
Basketball players from New Jersey
College men's basketball head coaches in the United States
Junior college men's basketball coaches in the United States
Kansas State Wildcats men's basketball coaches
New York Knicks draft picks
Oklahoma Sooners men's basketball coaches
People from Long Branch, New Jersey
Phillips 66ers players
Shooting guards
Sportspeople from Monmouth County, New Jersey
Tulane Green Wave men's basketball players